Wilhelm Bichl (born 3 February 1949 in Hall in Tirol) was an Austrian luger who competed in the late 1960s. He won a gold medal in the men's doubles event at the 1967 FIL European Luge Championships in Königssee, West Germany.

Bichl also finished seventh in the men's doubles event at the 1968 Winter Olympics in Grenoble.

References

Wallechinsky, David. (1984). "Luge - Men's two-seater". The Complete Book of the Olympics: 1896-1980. New York: Penguin Books. p. 576.
Wilhelm Bichl's profile at Sports Reference.com

Austrian male lugers
Olympic lugers of Austria
Lugers at the 1968 Winter Olympics
1949 births
Living people
People from Hall in Tirol
Sportspeople from Tyrol (state)